Peter de Loughry (or Deloughry; 4 February 1868 – 23 October 1931) was an Irish nationalist and politician, who was a leadership figure in Kilkenny city in the early 20th century.

Background
De Loughry married Winifred Murphy in 1911. Winifred would share her husband's political agenda, and would become President of Cumann na mBan in County Kilkenny during the Irish Revolutionary period.

Leading the IRB in Kilkenny
De Loughry was a committed Irish nationalist long even before the events of the 1916 Easter Rising, which would spark a surge of support in Ireland for Nationalism in its wake. In 1912 the Irish Republican Brotherhood (IRB), the Irish nationalist secret society, decided to try and re-establish a chapter of its organisation in Kilkenny City, and it was de Loughry who became the primary organiser of the chapter.

Irish Volunteers
On 5 March 1914, a company of Irish Volunteers was established in Kilkenny City. The Irish Volunteers were a paramilitary force created in response to the creation of the Ulster Volunteers. The Ulster Volunteers were a force created to violently resist the creation of an All-Ireland Parliament in the event of Home Rule being granted to Ireland by the British Government. The Irish Volunteers, in the event the Ulster Volunteers moved to do this, would have attempted to counteract them. However, in mid-1914 there was a split in the Irish Volunteers when John Redmond, leader of the Irish Parliamentary Party, called upon the Irish Volunteers to join the British Army and serve in World War I. This move was strongly and vocally opposed by the most radical nationalists among the Volunteers, among them the IRB. Those volunteers who followed Redmond's call took on the name National Volunteers while those who refused to join the British Army retained the name Irish Volunteers.

In Kilkenny in September 1914, de Loughly approached an assembly of Volunteers and asked those who rejected Redmond to leave their ranks and join him. Thomas Treacy, who witnessed this, described the event:  

As demonstrated by the small numbers who switched over to de Loughry, previous to 1916 the Irish Parliamentary Party remained extremely strong in County Kilkenny, partially because the Redmond family who led the IPP were based in County Waterford, which directly borders County Kilkenny.

Nonetheless, de Loughry pressed on with his radical Nationalist agenda. By 1916 those Volunteers in Kilkenny who had taken the anti-Redmond stance consolidated around de Loughry. De Loughry who ran a garage in Kilkenny city, converted part of it into a foundry and arsenal and began producing homemade grenades. The garage also meant De Loughry had easy access to vehicles, meaning he was able to provide transport and quick communication for his organisations.

Easter Rising
In the spring of 1916, Irish Nationalists conspired to launch a rebellion against British rule in Ireland, a plan which would eventually ferment as the Easter Rising. In the weeks directly before the rising, agents were sent to Kilkenny to make this plan known. Cathal Brugha, himself an IRB member, arrived in Kilkenny and told local Nationalists to gather arms and prepare for the arrival of J. J. "Ginger" O'Connell, who was to act as their commander.

When the Easter Rising started the Kilkenny company gathered each day and was ready to act. However, in the chaos surround Easter Rising, with different counties being sent conflicting information about whether the Rising was "on" or "called off", the Kilkenny company was unsure how to proceed. Ultimately they did not attack any Royal Irish Constabulary units. Nonetheless, in the aftermath of the rising Ginger O'Connell was arrested and so was De Loughry, and over 1,000 British Army soldiers were stationed in Kilkenny.

War of Independence 

In 1919, while still in prison, de Loughry was elected Mayor of Kilkenny, an office he would retain until 1925. He was also briefly Brigade Commandant of the Irish Republican Army army units in Kilkenny until he was once again arrested by British authorities.

Freeing de Valera
By the start of 1919, the British had several important nationalist figures arrested and imprisoned in Lincoln Gaol, England. Among them were Seán Milroy, Seán McGarry and most prominently of all, Éamon de Valera, the emerging leader of Sinn Féin and the nationalist movement overall. De Loughry joined them when he too was sent to the prison. A number of attempts were made to break these men out of the prison using forged keys, but all of these failed until de Loughry was asked for help. De Loughry was able to use his metalworking skills to forge a master key that was subsequently used in the successful escape of the other three from the prison, an event considered a major political and military coup for the nationalists against the British. De Loughry remained behind as his release date was just a few weeks away regardless.

During the Irish Civil War, de Loughry was in favour of the terms of the Anglo-Irish Treaty, leading him subsequently to joining Cumann na nGaedheal.

Post-war period
He was elected to the Irish Free State Seanad in 1922, but lost his seat at the 1925 election. He was elected to Dáil Éireann as a Cumann na nGaedheal Teachta Dála (TD) for the Carlow–Kilkenny constituency at the September 1927 general election. He died in office on 23 October 1931; no by-election was held for his seat.

A book about him called Peter's Key was published in 2012. The book recounts the story his involvement in the plot to free Éamon de Valera from Lincoln Gaol during the Irish War of Independence. During and after the escape from prison de Loughry remained the Mayor of Kilkenny, a position he held for six consecutive years.

References

1868 births
1931 deaths
Cumann na nGaedheal TDs
Cumann na nGaedheal senators
Mayors of Kilkenny
Members of the 1922 Seanad
Members of the 6th Dáil
Members of the Irish Republican Brotherhood